The Public Utility Building (also known as Subhash Chandra Bose Public Utility Building) is a skyscraper on Mahatma Gandhi Road,  Bangalore, India. It is one of the tallest buildings and a major commercial center of Bangalore. The architect of the building was Atul Sharma and the structural engineer was Kamal N Hadkar. The building is owned by the Bruhat Bengaluru Mahanagara Palike.
The Public Utility building with its 25 story is an all-in-one shopping complex that houses variety of business and commercial centers including offices, shops, boutiques, hotel, restaurants, theater and so forth.

See also

List of tallest buildings in Bangalore

References

Buildings and structures in Bangalore
Skyscraper office buildings in India